Trond Bjørndal (born 9 October 1969) is a Norwegian football coach and former player.

Hailing from Frekhaug, he started his career in IL Kvernbit, and later played for Åsane Fotball and Bryne FK. He joined FK Haugesund in 1997, and enjoyed a spell in the Norwegian Premier League in the seasons 1997 and 1998. He left ahead of the 2000 season to join Danish team Vejle BK, having formerly trialled for Sheffield United. He made eight appearances in the 1999–2000 Danish Superliga as Vejle were relegated.

Ahead of the 2004 season, Bjørndal was hired as head coach of Åsane, with Håkon Østevold as assistant coach. Bjørndal only stayed for one year, and was hired as assistant coach under Magnus Johansson at Løv-Ham Fotball ahead of the 2005 season. One year later, Johansson left and Bjørndal was promoted to head coach. Løv-Ham survived the battle against relegation, but Bjørndal resigned at the end of the season. Shortly thereafter, Bjørndal was hired as director of sports in Åsane.

References

1969 births
Living people
People from Meland
Norwegian footballers
Åsane Fotball players
Bryne FK players
FK Haugesund players
Eliteserien players
Vejle Boldklub players
Norwegian expatriate footballers
Norwegian expatriate sportspeople in Denmark
Expatriate men's footballers in Denmark
Norwegian football managers
Association football defenders
Sportspeople from Vestland